Epichloë disjuncta is a hybrid asexual species in the fungal genus Epichloë. 

A systemic and seed-transmissible grass symbiont first described in 2013,  Epichloë disjuncta is a natural allopolyploid of a strain in the Epichloë typhina complex and a second unknown Epichloë ancestor.

Epichloë disjuncta is found in Europe, where it has been identified in the grass species Hordelymus europaeus.

References 

disjuncta
Fungi described in 2013
Fungi of Europe